Teleuts are a Turkic indigenous people of Siberia living in Kemerovo Oblast, Russia. According to the 2010 census, there were 2,643 Teleuts in Russia. They speak the Southern Altai Teleut language/dialect.

In the Soviet years and until 2000, the authorities considered the Teleuts to be part of the Altai people. Currently, according to the Resolution of the Government of the Russian Federation No. 255 dated March 24, 2000, as well as 2002 and 2010 Russian Census, they are recognized as a separate ethnic group within indigenous small-numbered peoples of the North, Siberia and the Far East.

History 
The Teleuts were once part of the Tiele people. They came under the rule of the First Turkic Khaganate. The Teleuts emerged from the result of Kipchaks and Mongols mixing together. Near the end of the 16th century, the Teleuts wandered the steppe between the Irtysh and the Ob'. They became nominal subjects to the Oirats at this period. Their population at this time numbered 4,000 tents.

The Russians gained control of the region in the mid-eighteenth century and the Teleuts subsequently became their subjects. The Russians called the Teleuts "White Kalmyks" in their documents despite the ethnic and linguistic differences between the Kalmyks and Teleuts.

The Teleuts consider themselves to be a distinct people and many do not accept being labeled as Altaian. The majority of the Teleuts live along the Great and Little Bachat Rivers in Kemerovo Oblast. However, a few Teleuts also live in the Altai Republic.

Culture 
Most Teleuts used to be nomadic or semi-nomadic livestock herders and horses, goats, cattle, and sheep were the most common types of animals they raised. Some Teleuts were hunters and relied on animals living in the taiga for subsistence.

Traditional Teleut dwellings included conic yurts made out of bark or perches.

Common Teleut dress was composed of linen shirts, short breeches, and single-breasted robes.

Religion 
Most Teleuts are Orthodox Christians. However, there is a minority that practice shamanism. Burkhanism was once widely practiced by the Teleuts but was effectively eliminated during the Soviet era. Contemporary revivals of the religion among other Altaian groups have not affected the Teleuts. A minority of Teleuts moved up to the north of Kemerovo Oblast and interacted with local Tatars and became Sunni Muslims. Today they number around 500 and have mostly assimilated while keeping their Teleut roots, into the local Tatars and are known as the Kalmaks also adopting a local dialect of the Tatar language.
However some sources consider the language of the Kalmaks to be a separate variety of Tatar, or even a dialect of the Teleut language, as it differs greatly from other Siberian Tatar varieties.

See also
 Altay language
 Altayans
 Telengits
 Turkic peoples

References

External links
Association of the Teleut People 
ELAR archive of Documentation and Analysis of the Endangered Teleut Language

Turkic peoples of Asia
Indigenous peoples of North Asia
Ethnic groups in Russia
Indigenous small-numbered peoples of the North, Siberia and the Far East
Indigenous peoples in the Arctic